Onias Mupumha (born 23 February 1978) is a Zimbabwean sculptor. He is the winner of the 2008 NAMA (National Arts Merit Awards) awarded by Zimbabwe's National Arts Council.

External links
Online Gallery

1978 births
Living people
21st-century Zimbabwean sculptors
Place of birth missing (living people)